Kluskoil Lake Provincial Park is a provincial park in British Columbia, Canada, located on the West Road River (Blackwater River) downstream from the Euchiniko Lakes.

References

Geography of the Chilcotin
Provincial parks of British Columbia
1995 establishments in British Columbia
Protected areas established in 1995